Otto Erich Hartleben  (3 June 1864 – in Clausthal; 11 February 1905 in Salò) was a German poet and dramatist from Clausthal, known for his translation of Pierrot Lunaire.

Childhood, Education and Marriage
Orphaned as a child, Hartleben was brought up by his grandfather in Hanover. Among his youthful acquaintances there were Karl Henckel, Arthur Gutheil and the future industrialist and politician Alfred Hugenberg and together they published a volume of poetry Quartett in 1886. After completing his schooling in Celle in 1886 he went to study law, first in Leipzig, where he got to know Hermann Conradi and Adolf Bartels, and later in Berlin. He studied for the civil service in Stolberg (Harz) and in Magdeburg. Giving up his legal studies, he returned to Berlin where he lived as a freelance writer, eventually moving to Munich in 1901. After the death of his grandfather in 1893, Hartleben inherited 80,000 marks and on 2 December married his lifelong companion, ex-waitress “little mop” Selma Hesse.

Career
In 1900 he had a resounding success with his “officer’s tragedy” Rosenmontag (Carnival Monday) which deals with an ill-fated affair between a simple girl and a young officer from an old military family. He used the proceeds to purchase the Villa Halkyone in Salò on Lake Garda. Here he founded in 1903 the Halkyone Academy for the Pure Sciences, which included among its members Peter Behrens, Otto Julius Bierbaum, Franz Blei, Gerhart Hauptmann, Alfred Kubin, Emil Orlik and Ferdinand Pfohl, and which boasted just two rules: "§ 1. Membership of the Halkyone Academy confers neither duties nor rights.  § 2. Everything else is governed by the spirit of the Halkyone community."

Letters
Hartleben's legendary reputation in turn-of-century letters is due chiefly to the many artistic groups he founded or contributed to, from the Bavarian Bohemian Beer Brotherhood at school in Celle (1885) to the Menschenclub (a club for “humans”) in Magdeburg (1890), the Karlsbad Idealists’ Club (1891), the Verbrechertisch (“Rogues’ Table”) in Berlin (1896), the Berlin Naturalists’ Society known as Durch (“Through”), the Berlin drama movement Freie Bühne (“Free Stage”), the Berlin Free Literary Society, the Leipzig "Auguren College", not to mention the lively interest he took in the Friedrichshagener Dichterkreis (Friedrichshagen Poets Circle).

Journalist
He also co-produced the weekly journal Die Jugend (“Youth”), in which he made humorous jibes at contemporary society and its morals. One of his key characters was Serenissimus, the gone-to-seed ruler of an imaginary peppercorn principality.

Translator
He is especially noted today for his translations of other writers’ poetic works, in particular of Albert Giraud’s Pierrot Lunaire which forms the Sprechstimme text of Arnold Schoenberg’s work of that name.

Death
Hartleben died in Salò, Italy.

Works
"Studententagebuch", poetry, 1886
"Die Serényi", stories, 1887
"Angele", comedy, 1891
"Hanna Jagert", comedy, 1893
"Die Geschichte vom abgerissenen Knopfe", stories, 1893
"Ein Ehrenwort", drama, 1894
"Meine Verse", poetry, 1895
"Vom gastfreien Pastor", stories, 1895
"Der römische Maler", novella, 1898
"Ein wahrhaft guter Mensch", comedy, 1899
"Rosenmontag”, tragedy, 1900
"Von reifen Früchten. Meiner Verse zweiter Teil", poetry, 1902
"Liebe kleine Mama", stories, 1904
"Diogenes", comedy, 1905
"Im grünen Baum zur Nachtigall", Studentenstück, 1905
"Das Ehefest", novella, 1906
Tagebuch 1906
Aphorismen, edited by van den Trelde 1920

Filmography
The Serenyi, directed by Alfred Halm (1918, based on the novella Die Serényi)
Rosenmontag, directed by Rudolf Meinert (1924, based on the play Rosenmontag)
Love's Carnival, directed by Hans Steinhoff (1930, based on the play Rosenmontag)
Sommerliebe, directed by Erich Engel (1942, based on the novella Die Serényi)
Love's Carnival, directed by Willy Birgel (1955, based on the play Rosenmontag)

External links
Encyclopædia Britannica: Otto Erich Hartleben

1864 births
1905 deaths
19th-century German poets
Writers from Hanover
People from the Province of Hanover
Leipzig University alumni
Humboldt University of Berlin alumni
German male poets
German male dramatists and playwrights
19th-century German dramatists and playwrights
20th-century German dramatists and playwrights
German-language poets
19th-century German translators
19th-century German male writers
German male non-fiction writers